Chromosome 16 is one of the 23 pairs of chromosomes in humans. People normally have two copies of this chromosome. Chromosome 16 spans about 96 million base pairs (the building material of DNA) and represents just under 3% of the total DNA in cells.

Genes

Number of genes 
The following are some of the gene count estimates of human chromosome 16. Because researchers use different approaches to genome annotation their predictions of the number of genes on each chromosome varies (for technical details, see gene prediction). Among various projects, the collaborative consensus coding sequence project (CCDS) takes an extremely conservative strategy. So CCDS's gene number prediction represents a lower bound on the total number of human protein-coding genes.

Gene list 

The following is a partial list of genes on human chromosome 16. For complete list, see the link in the infobox on the right.

Diseases and disorders
Attention deficit hyperactivity disorder (ADHD)
Asperger syndrome
Autism spectrum disorder
Autosomal dominant polycystic kidney disease (PKD-1)
Batten disease
Combined malonic and methylmalonic aciduria (CMAMMA)
Familial Mediterranean fever (FMF)
Synesthesia
Thalassemia
Trisomy 16
Morquio syndrome

Associated traits
Red hair

Cytogenetic band

References

 
 
  In 
 http://omim.org/search?index=geneMap&search=16p13.3

External links

 
 

Chromosomes (human)